Leptophobia eucosma is a butterfly in the family Pieridae. It is found in Peru.

Subspecies
The following subspecies are recognised:
Leptophobia eucosma eucosma (Peru)
Leptophobia eucosma euremoides Röber, 1908 (Peru)

References

Pierini
Butterflies described in 1874
Pieridae of South America